Chamaegastrodia is a genus of flowering plants from the orchid family, Orchidaceae. Three species are currently recognized (May 2014), all native to eastern Asia and the Himalayas.

Chamaegastrodia inverta (W.W.Sm.) Seidenf. - Sichuan, Yunnan
Chamaegastrodia shikokiana Makino & F.Maek. - Japan, Korea, Assam, Bhutan, Nepal, Sichuan, Tibet
Chamaegastrodia vaginata (Hook.f.) Seidenf. - Assam, Bhutan, Hubei, Sichuan

See also 
 List of Orchidaceae genera

References 

 Pridgeon, A.M., Cribb, P.J., Chase, M.A. & Rasmussen, F. eds. (1999). Genera Orchidacearum 1. Oxford Univ. Press.
 Pridgeon, A.M., Cribb, P.J., Chase, M.A. & Rasmussen, F. eds. (2001). Genera Orchidacearum 2. Oxford Univ. Press.
 Pridgeon, A.M., Cribb, P.J., Chase, M.A. & Rasmussen, F. eds. (2003). Genera Orchidacearum 3. Oxford Univ. Press
 Berg Pana, H. 2005. Handbuch der Orchideen-Namen. Dictionary of Orchid Names. Dizionario dei nomi delle orchidee. Ulmer, Stuttgart

External links 

Cranichideae genera
Goodyerinae